In enzymology, a glucose-1-phosphate guanylyltransferase is an enzyme that catalyzes the chemical reaction

GTP + alpha-D-glucose 1-phosphate  diphosphate + GDP-glucose

Thus, the two substrates of this enzyme are GTP and alpha-D-glucose 1-phosphate, whereas its two products are diphosphate and GDP-glucose.

This enzyme belongs to the family of transferases, specifically those transferring phosphorus-containing nucleotide groups (nucleotidyltransferases).  The systematic name of this enzyme class is GTP:alpha-D-glucose-1-phosphate guanylyltransferase. Other names in common use include GDP glucose pyrophosphorylase, and guanosine diphosphoglucose pyrophosphorylase.  This enzyme participates in starch and sucrose metabolism.

References

 

EC 2.7.7
Enzymes of unknown structure